The Arizona Railway Museum  is a railroad museum located in Chandler, Arizona.

It was founded and incorporated as a non-profit organization in 1983.  It is dedicated to the railroads of Arizona and the Southwestern United States.  It has an extensive collection railroad rolling stock and artifacts. Two of items on display are listed in the National Register of Historic Places, they are the "Southern Pacific Railroad Locomotive No. SP 2562" and "Tender No. 8365" and the "Railroad Steam Wrecking Crane and Tool Car".

Museum gallery
The following images are of the Arizona Railway Museum and its exhibits which include two cars listed in the National Register of Historic Places.

See also
 List of museums in Arizona
 List of heritage railroads in the United States
 List of heritage railways

References

External links
 

Buildings and structures in Chandler, Arizona
Transportation in Chandler, Arizona
Museums in Maricopa County, Arizona
Railroad museums in Arizona
Museums established in 1983
1983 establishments in Arizona